Anel Karim Husic (born 1 March 2001) is a Swiss professional footballer who plays as a centre-back for Swiss Super League club Lausanne-Sport.

Personal life 
Born in Switzerland, Husic is of Bosnian descent. He holds both Swiss and Bosnian citizenship.

References 

2001 births
Living people
People from Yverdon-les-Bains
Swiss men's footballers
Bosnia and Herzegovina footballers
Swiss people of Bosnia and Herzegovina descent
Association football central defenders
FC Lausanne-Sport players
Swiss Super League players
Switzerland youth international footballers
Sportspeople from the canton of Vaud